Winfield Corners Stone House is a historic home located at Rochester in Ulster County, New York.  It is a -story, field stone house that is linear in plan with frame additions.  It was built about 1732.  The main house block has a central cross gable with a pair of flanking gable dormers.

It was listed on the National Register of Historic Places in 1999.

References

Houses on the National Register of Historic Places in New York (state)
Houses completed in 1732
Houses in Ulster County, New York
National Register of Historic Places in Ulster County, New York